The David di Donatello Awards, named after Donatello's David, a symbolic statue of the Italian Renaissance, are film awards given out each year by the Accademia del Cinema Italiano (The Academy of Italian Cinema). There are 26 award categories, as of 2021.

The industry-voted awards are considered the Italian equivalent of the American Academy Awards and rank among top-tier awards such as the Premio Regia Televisiva for television, the Premio Ubu for stage performances, the Sanremo Music Festival, and the annual Venice Film Festival, which hosts the Golden Lion film award.

History
The David di Donatello film awards follow the same criteria as the American Academy Awards.) The ceremony was established in 1955 in order to honour the best of each year's Italian and foreign films, and first awarded in Rome on 5 July 1956.

Similar prizes had already existed in Italy for about a decade, such as the Nastro d.'Gentro, but these were voted on by film critics and journalists. However, the Donatellos are awarded by people within the film industry, including actors, producers, directors, screenwriters, and technicians.

After Rome, from 1957 to 1980, the ceremony was held at the Greek Theatre in Taormina during Taormina Film Fest, then twice in Florence, finally returning to Rome, always with the support of the President of the Italian Republic and now with the collaboration of the Rome City Council cultural policies department. During the years 1950s, when the ceremony was held in Taormina, it was organized by journalist and film producer Michael Stern, who later went on to found The Michael Stern Parkinson's Research Foundation in New York City.

The founding organization, now called the Accademia del Cinema Italiano, works in concert with and thanks to the contribution of the Italian Ministry of Performing Arts and the Ministry for Cultural Properties and Activities.

The prizes are awarded primarily to Italian films, with a category dedicated to foreign-language films.

Presidents

Here is a list of presidents of the Academy of Italian Cinema:

† Died in office.

Trophy
The David di Donatello trophy is in the form of a gold David statuette, a replica of Donatello's famous sculpture, on a square malachite base with a gold plaque recording the award category, year, and winner.

The 1956 David by Bulgari, awarded to Gina Lollobrigida for Beautiful but Dangerous, was auctioned at Sotheby's in 2013.

Award categories
 David di Donatello for Best Film
 David di Donatello for Best Director
 David di Donatello for Best New Director
 David di Donatello for Best Producer
 David di Donatello for Best Actress
 David di Donatello for Best Actor
 David di Donatello for Best Supporting Actress
 David di Donatello for Best Supporting Actor
 David di Donatello for Best Original Screenplay
 David di Donatello for Best Adapted Screenplay
 David di Donatello for Best Cinematography
 David di Donatello for Best Score
 David di Donatello for Best Original Song
 David di Donatello for Best Set Designer
 David di Donatello for Best Costumes
 David di Donatello for Best Makeup
 David di Donatello for Best Hair Design
 David di Donatello for Best Editing
 David di Donatello for Best Sound
 David di Donatello for Best Visual Effects VFX
 David di Donatello for Best Documentary Feature
 David di Donatello for Best Foreign Film
 David di Donatello for Best Short Film
 David Youth Award (formerly known as David School Award)
 David Special Award (also known as David Career Award during some years) 
 David Viewers' Award (since 2019)

Retired awards
 David di Donatello for Best Foreign Director (1966–1990)
 David di Donatello for Best Foreign Actor (1957–1996)
 David di Donatello for Best Foreign Actress (1957–1996)
 David di Donatello for Best New Actor (1982–1983)
 David di Donatello for Best New Actress (1982–1983)
 David di Donatello for Best European Film (2004–2018, merged into Best Foreign Film)
 David di Donatello for Best Screenplay (1975–2016, split into Best Original Screenplay and Best Adapted Screenplay)
 David di Donatello for Best Foreign Producer (1956–1990 except 1959, 1960, 1962, 1963, 1964, and from 1972 to 1980)
 David di Donatello for Best Foreign Screenplay (1979–1990)
 David di Donatello for Best Foreign Score (1979–1980)
 Golden plaque (1956–2001 except 1961, 1962, from 1975 to 1983, and from 1985 to 1989)
 European David (1973–1983)
 David Franco Cristaldi (1992 and 1993)
 David Luchino Visconti (1976–1995)
 David René Clair (1982–1987)
 Alitalia Award (1984–1991)
 Gold medal of the Municipality of Rome
 Gold medal of the Minister for Tourism and Entertainment

Statistics

Multiple prize-winning actors
As of 2020, with seven awards each, Margherita Buy, Alberto Sordi, Vittorio Gassman, and Sophia Loren are the actors who have won the most Davids.

See also
 Italian entertainment awards

References

External links

  
  
 
 David di Donatello 1956–2016: 60 Years of Awards. Journal of Italian Cinema & Media Studies (2016), 4 (2), Intellect, 

 
Italian film awards
International film awards